Magdalena is a Czech novel, written by Josef Svatopluk Machar. It was first published in 1893.

1893 Czech novels